A wonton font (also known as Chinese, chopstick, chop suey, or kung-fu) is an ethnic typeface with a visual style intended to express an Asian or Chinese aesthetic. 

Styled to mimic the brush strokes used in Chinese characters, wonton fonts often convey a sense of Orientalism. In modern times, they are sometimes viewed as culturally insensitive or offensive.

Controversy
Some Asian-Americans find wonton fonts amusing or humorous, while others find them offensive, insulting, or racist. The font's usage is often criticized when paired with caricatures that harken back to the Yellow Peril images of the late 19th and 20th century. In 2002, the clothing retailer Abercrombie & Fitch faced controversy when it produced a series of T-shirts with buck-toothed images and wonton font slogans. The Chicago Cubs were hit with backlash from the Asian community after a similarly offensive T-shirt was produced by an independent vendor in 2008. The questionable use of such fonts was the subject of an article in the Wall Street Journal by cultural commentator Jeff Yang.

References

External links
 History of the "chop suey" font (2022)

Typography
Asian studies
Chinoiserie
Stereotypes of East Asian people